In enzymology, a glycolaldehyde dehydrogenase is an enzyme that catalyzes the chemical reaction

glycolaldehyde + NAD+ + H2O  glycolate + NADH + H+

The 3 substrates of this enzyme are glycolaldehyde, NAD+, and H2O, whereas its 3 products are glycolate, NADH, and H+.

This enzyme belongs to the family of oxidoreductases, specifically those acting on the aldehyde or oxo group of donor with NAD+ or NADP+ as acceptor.  The systematic name of this enzyme class is glycolaldehyde:NAD+ oxidoreductase. This enzyme is also called glycol aldehyde dehydrogenase.  This enzyme participates in glyoxylate and dicarboxylate metabolism.

Structural studies

References

 

EC 1.2.1
NADH-dependent enzymes
Enzymes of known structure